In  Shia Islam,   Hassani (Arabic/Persian: سید حسني), is a  Sayyid (young man) whose rising is predicted to be  among the signs of the reappearance of al-Mahdi. Seyyed Hassani will come out from the side of Deilam (Gilan and the west of Mazandaran). 

According to—Islamic—narrations: whereas he shouts loudly "(you) help Imam-Mahdi", gallant and great-hearted men will assist him. Seyyed Hassani will remove the Earth from the existence of oppressors and Kafirs, from his place till Kufa. This progress is done simultaneously with coming out of al-Mahdi from Mecca—that al-Mahdi comes to Kufa (from Mecca), and he will be join al-Mahdi.

Descent 
Hassani (who has been described as a good-looking young man) is from the offspring (descents) of the second Imam of Shia Islam, Hasan ibn Ali, and presumably that's why he is named as Seyyed Hassani.

Nafse Zakiyyah 
According to a part of Ulema (scholars): probably, "Hassani" is the same Nafs-e-Zakiyyah which is among the definite signs of Dhuhur.

Murder 
Seyyed Hassani who will give allegiance with al-Mahdi, will eventually be killed in Mecca.

See also 

 Mahdi
 Sufyani
 Al-Yamani
 The Occultation
 Khasf al-Bayda'
 Nafs-e-Zakiyyah
 Seyed Khorasani
 The voice from sky
 Reappearance of Muhammad al-Mahdi
 Signs of the reappearance of Muhammad al-Mahdi

References 

Shia eschatology
Shia imams
Islamic terminology
Shia Islam
Islamic eschatology
Mahdism